John Durrett Craddock (October 26, 1881 – May 20, 1942) was a U.S. Representative from Kentucky, USA.

Born in Munfordville, Kentucky, Craddock attended the public schools of Hart County.
During the Philippine Insurrection and also during the Boxer Uprising in China served as a corporal and sergeant in Troop F, Third United States Cavalry.
He was employed as a railroad engineer with the Isthmian Canal Commission, Panama Canal Zone from 1904 to 1910.
He returned to Munfordville, Kentucky, in 1910 and engaged in banking and agricultural pursuits.
He served as member of the board of trustees of Munfordville 1910–1925.
Assisted in organizing the Burley Tobacco Growers Association in 1922 and served as director from 1922 to 1941.
He served as member of the Kentucky Mammoth Cave National Park Commission 1922–1928.

Craddock was elected as a Republican to the Seventy-first Congress (March 4, 1929 – March 3, 1931).
He was an unsuccessful candidate for reelection in 1930 to the Seventy-second Congress.
Field man, Federal Farm Board, Washington, D.C., in 1931 and 1932.
Agent of the Kentucky Blue Grass Cooperative Association, Winchester, Kentucky, in 1933 and 1934.
Treasurer of Hart County at Munfordville, Kentucky, in 1934 and 1935.
He resumed his former pursuits.
He served as a member of the State Agricultural Adjustment Administration Committee from 1939 until his death.
He died in Louisville, Kentucky, May 20, 1942.
He was interred in New Munfordville Cemetery, Munfordville, Kentucky.

References

John D. Craddock at The Political Graveyard

1881 births
1942 deaths
American people of Welsh descent
United States Army soldiers
Republican Party members of the United States House of Representatives from Kentucky
People from Munfordville, Kentucky
20th-century American politicians